Johannes Hendrikus Hubert "John" de Mol Jr. (born 24 April 1955) is a Dutch media tycoon. De Mol is one of the men behind production companies Endemol and Talpa. He created the reality television formats Big Brother, Fear Factor and The Voice.

Forbes estimated him to be worth about US$1.5 billion in 2017.

Endemol 
De Mol acquired his fortune producing television programmes. From 1997 to 1999 he developed the popular reality television series Big Brother with his production company, John de Mol Produkties. In 1994 his company merged with Joop van den Ende TV-Producties into Endemol, but it still functioned on its own. He produced Fear Factor, Love Letters, 1 vs. 100 and Deal or No Deal (Miljoenenjacht) for Endemol. De Mol sold his share of Endemol in 2000 to Telefónica but continued to serve as creative director until 2004. In 2005, he was listed on the Forbes Magazine list of the 500 richest people in the world.

Talpa Media Holding 
After departing Endemol in 2004, De Mol founded his own television station. The proposed name, Tien (Dutch for 10), was disputed by competitor SBS Broadcasting, owner of the TV10 brand. The channel had to launch under the Talpa brand, Latin for mole which translates to mol in Dutch. Later the name dispute was ended, which resulted in the rebranding of Talpa to Tien. The station scored bad ratings, despite scooping the rights of the Eredivisie football league. In 2007 De Mol decided to close down Tien and sold the channel to RTL Nederland, retaining a share in that company. De Mol also sold Radio 538 to RTL Nederland, which he acquired in 2005. Talpa remained the name of the holding company managing De Mol's assets and the production company which continued to produce several programmes for the RTL network, including the highly successful Ik Hou van Holland.

Buying SBS 
In 2011 Talpa worked together with Finnish media conglomerate Sanoma to buy the Dutch activities of SBS Broadcasting from German broadcaster ProSiebenSat.1 Media. As part of that deal, De Mol sold his shares in RTL Nederland to the RTL Group, retaining the ownership of Radio 538 and its sister stations Radio 10 Gold and SLAM!FM.

The Voice 
In 2010, a new reality competition series, The Voice of Holland, was launched by De Mol. It was a large success in the Netherlands and the formula was sold to several other countries around the globe. The Voice (of America) launched on NBC on 27 April 2011 with De Mol and Mark Burnett as executive producers. In The Voice, the singing auditions are 'blind': the jury is turned with their back to the competitors. Once having 'selected' by pushing a button, the juror turns towards the competitor. This concept, the creation of De Mol and Dutch singer Roel van Velzen, makes it "all about the voice." After these blind auditions, the coaches will train their competitors through knock-out battles and public voting rounds until there is one competitor left, who will be named as 'The Voice'.

Personal life

De Mol was formerly married to singer and actress Willeke Alberti. The actor Johnny de Mol is their son. From 1980 to 1984, Luv' singer Marga Scheide was his partner. Outside of television, De Mol controls a large private equity fund which, at one time, owned significant shares of car manufacturer Spyker Cars and telecommunications company Versatel. John's sister, broadcaster and actress Linda de Mol, presents or appears in, some of Endemol's programmes, including the original Dutch version of Deal or No Deal, Miljoenenjacht (Hunt for Millions).

See also 
 List of Dutch by net worth

References

Sources 
  Profile, forbes.com; accessed 22 April 2015.

External links 

 

1955 births
Living people
Dutch chief executives in the media industry
Dutch corporate directors
Dutch television producers
Dutch television personalities
Dutch billionaires
Dutch stock traders
People from Hilversum
Endemol
Primetime Emmy Award winners
20th-century Dutch businesspeople
21st-century Dutch businesspeople